The 2013–14 Biathlon World Cup – World Cup 6 was held in Antholz, Italy, from January 16 until January 19, 2014.

Schedule of events

Medal winners

Men

Women

Achievements

 Best performance for all time

 , 1st place in Sprint
 , 1st place in Sprint
 , 2nd place in Pursuit
 , 7th place in Pursuit
 , 8th place in Sprint
 , 14th place in Pursuit
 , 25th place in Sprint
 , 1st place in Sprint
 , 2nd place in Pursuit
 , 27th place in Sprint
 , 31st place in Pursuit
 , 41st place in Pursuit
 , 42nd place in Pursuit
 , 44th place in Sprint
 , 64th place in Sprint

 First World Cup race

 , 90th place in Sprint
 , 100th place in Sprint
 , 54th place in Sprint
 , 55th place in Sprint
 , 59th place in Sprint
 , 62nd place in Sprint
 , 97th place in Sprint

References 

2013–14 Biathlon World Cup
Biathlon World Cup
January 2014 sports events in Europe
Biathlon competitions in Italy